Austin Christopher Robertson (born 29 April 1943) is a former Australian rules footballer who played with  in the Victorian Football League (VFL) and  in the Western Australian National Football League (WANFL). He is the son of former South Melbourne player Austin Robertson senior.

Robertson was a full forward and by the time he retired in 1974 he had amassed a WANFL record goal tally of 1211 goals, topped the WANFL goalkicking a record eight times (previous best of six by George Doig and Bernie Naylor) and kicked over 100 goals in a season six times.

He was a premiership player with Subiaco in 1973, the only Grand Final of his career.

While playing for Subiaco he averaged 4.82 goals a game, being held goalless in a match only five times, two of which were in his final season when he was affected by injury and in 1968, kicked 162 goals. He spent a season with his father's club  in 1966, kicking 60 goals in 18 games, which won the  club's goalkicking for the year.

After his football career ended, Robertson was employed by businessman Kerry Packer and was one of the central figures in the establishment of World Series Cricket in 1977. Robertson subsequently managed many of Australia's leading cricketers over a period of 30 years, including Shane Warne.

He was inducted into the Australian Football Hall of Fame in 2015.

References

External links

Living people
1943 births
Australian rules footballers from Perth, Western Australia
Sydney Swans players
Subiaco Football Club players
Australian Football Hall of Fame inductees
West Australian Football Hall of Fame inductees